Chameleon is a 1972 album by The Four Seasons notable for being their only album recorded for Motown. The album met with limited success in the US; no single was even issued from the album in America. "The Night", however, met with success in the UK and peaked at No. 7 in 1975, becoming a Northern Soul mainstay.

Track listing

Non-album singles 
The following singles were recorded during the band's tenure at Motown; none of these appeared on Chameleon. Some, however, later turned up on Frankie Valli's 1975 "solo" album Inside You, which was a collection of unreleased songs and outtakes from Chameleon.

"Walk On, Don't Look Back/Sun Country" - MoWest 5026
"How Come?/Life and Breath" - Motown 1255
"Hickory/Charisma" - Motown 1288
"You've Got Your Troubles/Listen to Yesterday" - Motown 1251
"The Scalawag Song (And I Will Love You)/Hickory" - Motown 1279

Legacy 
Although reception at the time of release was lukewarm, opinions today from both fans and critics are very positive. Noted for the distinctive Motown sound combined with the sounds of the Four Seasons, the album's "slick pop production values" made for a unique album in their catalog. Chameleon was unavailable on compact disc until 2008, when Universal Music Group, the parent owner of Motown Records, released a 2-disc compilation titled Frankie Valli and the Four Seasons: The Motown Years. It included this album, Frankie Valli's Inside You (1975), and all the non-album singles. With this release, all of the Four Seasons' material recorded for Motown is now accessible to a new audience, as well as for longtime fans.

The Motown Years Track listing 

Disc one
"A New Beginning (Prelude)" – 1:21
"Sun Country" – 4:07
"You're a Song (That I Can't Sing)" – 3:13
"The Night" – 3:25
"A New Beginning" – 4:47
"When the Morning Comes" – 4:39
"Poor Fool" – 4:10
"Touch the Rainchild" – 4:23
"Love Isn't Here (Like It Used to Be)" – 3:45
"Walk On, Don't Look Back" – 2:58
"How Come?" – 3:45
"Life and Breath" – 3:08
"Hickory" – 2:52
"Charisma" (Unedited Version) – 4:30
"Charisma" (Single Version) - 3:20

Disc two
"Just Look What You've Done" – 4:49
"Love Isn't Here (Like It Used to Be)" (1975 remix) – 3:50
"Baby I Need Your Loving" – 3:06
"Inside You" – 4:05
"Thank You" – 3:33
"Hickory" – 3:02
"Life and Breath" (1975 remix) – 2:59
"The Night" (1975 remix) – 3:21
"With My Eyes Wide Open" – 4:31
"You've Got Your Troubles" – 4:06
"Listen to Yesterday" – 4:03
"The Scalawag Song (And I Will Love You)" – 2:42

Personnel
Partial credits.

The Four Seasons
 Frankie Valli - vocals
 Bob Gaudio - vocals, keyboards, piano, producer
 Joe Long - vocals, bass guitar
 Demetri Callas - vocals, guitar
 Billy DeLoach – vocals, keyboards
 Lee Shapiro – vocals, keyboards
Additional personnel
 Paul Wilson - drums
 Al Ruzicka - keyboards
 Clay Jordan – guitar

References 

1972 albums
The Four Seasons (band) albums
Albums arranged by Charles Calello
Albums produced by Bob Gaudio
Motown albums